Arnold Thomsen (31 May 1913 – 8 June 2001) was a Danish gymnast. He competed in eight events at the 1948 Summer Olympics.

References

External links
 

1913 births
2001 deaths
Danish male artistic gymnasts
Olympic gymnasts of Denmark
Gymnasts at the 1948 Summer Olympics
People from Esbjerg
Sportspeople from the Region of Southern Denmark